The R741 road is a regional road in County Wexford, Ireland. From its junction with the R772 in Gorey it takes a southerly route to its junction with the R730 in the centre of Wexford Town, where it terminates. 

The road is of good quality, well surfaced and lined, throughout. It is used as an alternative route to the N11 national primary road for traffic between Gorey and Wexford Town. 

In the vicinity of the R744 at Castle Ellis, the road is known locally as "the new line", constructed in the 1820s.

The traditional iconic view of Wexford Town is the bridge over the Slaney sweeping across in  the foreground with the town behind it (for an example see ). The bridge is the final stage of R741 southwards. 

See also
Roads in Ireland
National primary road
National secondary road

References
Roads Act 1993 (Classification of Regional Roads) Order 2006 – Department of Transport

Regional roads in the Republic of Ireland
Roads in County Wexford